"Ode to Sleep" is a 2011 song by Twenty One Pilots

Poetry
"Ode to Sleep", by Papinius Statius, translated 1923 by Richard S. Lambert for The Stanton Press
"Ode to Sleep", by Thomas Falconer (classical scholar)
"Ode to Sleep", by John Ogilvie (poet) 1758

Music
Calliope's ode to sleep ("Gentle Morpheus") in Alceste (Alcides) HWV 45, composed for Giulia Frasi by Handel